Bretton Hall is a twelve-story residential building at 2350 Broadway, spanning from West 85th to 86th Street on the Upper West Side of Manhattan, New York City.

History
It was completed in 1903, as the Hotel Bretton Hall, a residential hotel billing itself as the largest hotel uptown. The architect was Harry B. Mulliken, of Mulliken and Moeller, who designed numerous other hotels: the Cumberland Hotel, Thomas Jefferson Hotel, and the Spencer Arms Hotel on Broadway, the Hotel Lucerne on Amsterdam Avenue at 79th Street, and the Van Dyck, the Severn, the Jermyn, and the Chepstow apartment buildings on the Upper West Side.

The 86th Street Company received the unimproved property from Le Grand K. Petit with a mortgage of $90,000 on it. A building loan of $1,250,000 at 6% was secured from the Metropolitan Life Insurance Company on March 10, 1902. Afterward the 86th Street Company mortgaged the property for $1,365,000 at 6%, due October 1, 1903, to the General Building and Construction Company. John R. & Oscar L. Foley leased Bretton Hall to Anderson & Price for twenty-one years for a price of $2,394,000, for Irons & Todd, who comprised the Seaboard Realty and 86th Street Companies.

In the early 1980s, an organization called Artists Assistance Services rented apartments in the Bretton Hall at lower prices to people in the arts. A proviso was that they would have to share their spaces with a "cultural activity", such as a karate class.

Architecture
When it opened in late 1903, the apartment hotel was fireproof and equipped with an electric
plant and six elevators. It had a deckhouse and basement. The structure contained 187 suites, 506 rooms, 231 baths, and 385 toilet rooms. Its rear measurement was 204.4 feet. Plans for Bretton Hall were filed on June 7, 1902 with an estimated cost of construction of $1,550,000.

The New York Produce Exchange Bank opened a branch at the Bretton Hall Hotel in November 1903. They leased offices in the edifice for a period of ten years, for an annual rental between $2,500 to $3,500. It was subsequently acquired by investor Benjamin Winter, Sr., who lost it in 1932 during the Great Depression, after filing for bankruptcy.

In the early 21st century, the red brick and limestone building has 461 rental apartments. Its facade employs cornerstones repeatedly, particularly above the central bay above the Broadway entrance. It has a large stainless steel marquee and a four-step-up entrance with a disabled ramp side approach. It is without a garage, sidewalk landscaping, health club, or roof deck. Bretton Hall employs a concierge. The building features ornamental balconies and other architectural attributes. Its fenestration
is haphazard. Its facade exemplifies Beaux Arts architecture, yet it lacks the elaborate cornice it originally had. It was lost many years ago. Architect J.C. Calderon has redesigned the parapet in red brick with stone put down in alternating stripes. The restoration of the building cost $1,000,000.

References

External links

Bretton Hall photo and article at thecityreview.com retrieved on 2-12-08.

Residential buildings in Manhattan
Cultural history of New York City
1903 establishments in New York City
Upper West Side
Broadway (Manhattan)
Hotels established in 1903
Hotel buildings completed in 1903